Kim Possible is an American made-for-TV action comedy film that premiered as a Disney Channel Original Movie on Disney Channel on February 15, 2019. Based on the animated series of same name created by Mark McCorkle and Bob Schooley, the film stars Sadie Stanley, Sean Giambrone, and Ciara Riley Wilson.

Plot 
In Europe, American high school students and crimefighters Kim Possible and Ron Stoppable have thwarted a world dominating scheme of Professor Dementor and rescued Dr. Glopman, whom Dementor had kidnapped.

As Kim Possible and Ron Stoppable start their first day of school, they meet a new student named Athena and take her on a mission to stop the plot of the evil Dr. Drakken. Athena (a skilled bōjutsuka) defeats Dr. Drakken's henchwoman Shego, making her the topic of conversation at Middleton High School despite Kim's jealousy. When the school honors Athena and her good deed, Shego and Dr. Drakken force their way into the ceremony. Kim tries to defeat Shego and her army of henchwomen but falls to the ground, leaving Athena vulnerable to kidnap. Athena is kidnapped, and Kim is laughed at. After Kim talks with her family and Ron, they decide to rescue Athena from Drakken's and Shego's lair.

At the lair, Kim discovers Athena is part of Drakken's and Shego's plan to steal Kim's motivational essence and transfer it into Drakken with his brain-modulating device. Athena is revealed to be an android built by Drakken, specifically for this. As Kim short-circuits the transfer machine, Dr. Drakken is de-aged into a pre-adolescent version of himself. Despite Kim's insistence that she save herself, Athena stays behind to turn off the now-unstable machine. The lair explodes and Athena is presumed killed, but it is revealed that she has survived the explosion. Kim and Ron take her home to be repaired and programmed to be a hero alongside themselves.

During the credits, Dr. Drakken, posing as a gifted student with Shego posing as his mother, enrolls at Kim's high school and begins his plan to defeat her.

Cast

 Sadie Stanley as Kim Possible
 Sean Giambrone as Ron Stoppable, Kim's best friend and sidekick.
 Ciara Riley Wilson as Athena, a new student and bōjutsu practitioner at Kim's school. 
 Taylor Ortega as Shego, Drakken's flame-fisted accomplice.
 Connie Ray as Nana Possible, Kim's grandmother.
 Issac Ryan Brown as Wade, a teenage computer genius and inventor.
 Erika Tham as Bonnie Rockwaller, Kim's enemy since childhood.
 Todd Stashwick as Drakken, a mad scientist and Kim's archenemy.
 Maxwell Simkins as Young Drakken
 Alyson Hannigan as Dr. Ann Possible, Kim's brain surgeon mother.
 Matthew Clarke as James Timothy Possible, Kim's rocket scientist father.
 Owen Fielding as Tim Possible, Kim's younger brother.
 Connor Fielding as Jim Possible, Kim's younger brother.
 Michael P. Northey as Mr. Barkin, Kim and Ron's teacher.
 Patrick Sabongui as Dr. Glopman, a scientist captured by Professor Dementor.
 Cedric Ducharme as Cool Todd
 Christy Carlson Romano as Poppy Blu, a pop star. Romano was the original voice of Kim in the animated series.
 Nancy Cartwright as Rufus, Ron's pet naked mole-rat. Cartwright reprises her role from the animated series.
 Patton Oswalt as Professor Dementor, a mad scientist. Oswalt also voiced Dementor in the animated series.

Production

Development 
In between working on the first and second seasons of the Kim Possible animated series, creators Bob Schooley and Mark McCorkle had begun writing a script for a live-action film adaptation, which ultimately never came to fruition due to unknown reasons.

On February 7, 2018, it was announced that a live-action film based on the animated series Kim Possible was in production at Disney Channel. The series' creators Mark McCorkle and Bob Schooley served as executive producers, as did Josh Cagan, Zanne Devine, Adam B. Stein, and Zach Lipovsky. On April 25, 2018, it was announced that the film would go into production in mid-2018 for a 2019 premiere. The film is a production of Middleton Productions. On December 7, 2018, it was announced that the film would premiere on Disney Channel and DisneyNOW on February 15, 2019.

Casting 
On April 25, 2018, Sadie Stanley and Sean Giambrone were cast in the film. On May 25, 2018, it was announced that Alyson Hannigan, Connie Ray, Todd Stashwick, Taylor Ortega, Ciara Wilson, and Erika Tham were cast in the film. On June 22, 2018, it was announced that Raven's Home star Issac Ryan Brown was cast in the film. On August 11, 2018, it was announced that Christy Carlson Romano and Patton Oswalt were cast in the film. On January 14, 2019, it was announced that Nancy Cartwright was cast in the film.

Filming
Principal photography began on June 4, 2018 and wrapped on July 23, 2018.

Reception

Ratings 
During its premiere in the 8:00 pm time slot, Kim Possible attracted 1.24 million viewers with a 0.22 rating for people aged 18–49, making it the lowest-rated Disney Channel Original Movie premiere of the last decade until 2021's Disney Channel Original Movie, Under Wraps.

Critical response 

Brian Lowry of CNN wrote: "It's all a good deal of fun, bringing the animated show to life while riffing on those conventions. That said, the tone can be a bit uneven, with Stanley nicely turning Kim into a flesh-and-blood girl, while Giambrone's Ron is played much closer to the cartoon version." Petrana Radulovic of Polygon said that the film "keeps the true spirit of the DCOMs many of us grew up with — Wendy Wu Homecoming Warrior, Halloweentown, and Zenon: Girl of the 21st Century among them", and added: "Kim Possible is campy and hammers in its message with the subtlety of a sledgehammer, but that's not a critique. It just means that Kim Possible is, like most in the DCOM canon, a fun movie, and little else."

Accolades 
Sabrina Pitre was nominated at the 2020 Canadian Cinema Editors Awards in the category Best Editing in Family - Series or MOW, Live Action for her work on this film.

Miniseries 
The film was followed by the miniseries Kim Hushable which aired between June 5 and 24, 2019. The shorts take place after the movie and focus on Kim, Ron, and Athena as they help out in a library during spring break, all while dealing with various rogues and impressing Mr. Dewey. Warhok and Warmonga, who appeared in the original series, make an appearance in the shorts.

References

External links 
 

2019 television films
2019 films
American action adventure films
American comedy films
Disney Channel Original Movie films
Films scored by James Dooley
Films set in the United States
Films shot in Vancouver
Kim Possible films
Live-action films based on animated series
2019 action comedy films
2010s English-language films
2010s American films